Gothic Hospital is a book by Australian author Gary Crew.

Synopsis
The book focuses on a teenager named Johnny Doolan who discovers many old gothic books in his attic after his younger sister dies of tuberculosis, which results in his parents breaking up. The books' chapters are replaced by "sessions" as the book is partly set at a psychiatrist's office.

In the book, Johnny claims to his psychiatrist that when he reads the books in his attic, the book "fills itself in" with colour, and Johnny becomes part of the story. One book Johnny particularly becomes engrossed in, is a book about an old Gothic hospital, and Johnny eventually believes that his father is trapped in the book.

Release
Gothic Hospital was first published in Australia in 2001 through Lothian Books.

Further reading

References

External links 

 http://www.fantasticfiction.co.uk/c/gary-crew/gothic-hospital.htm
 http://www.tabula-rasa.info/AusHorror/GothicHospital.html

2001 Australian novels
Australian Gothic novels
Novels by Gary Crew
Lothian Books books